Ann Marie Burr (December 14, 1952  disappeared August 31, 1961) was an American child who vanished under mysterious circumstances from her home in the North End section of Tacoma, Washington. Her disappearance, which made national headlines, received renewed attention when it was theorized that serial killer Ted Bundy  who lived in Tacoma as a teenager at the time  might have been responsible for her abduction.

The first of four children of a middle-class Catholic family, Burr was raised in Tacoma alongside her three siblings. On the night of August 30, 1961, Ann went to sleep in an upstairs bedroom of the family's home, which she shared with her three-year-old sister. At some point during the evening, Burr awoke her mother, Beverly, notifying her that her younger sister, recovering from a broken arm, was crying. After comforting the three-year-old, Beverly put both girls back to bed. At approximately 5:30 a.m. on August 31, the family realized that Burr was no longer in her bedroom. Searches of the home revealed the front door had been left ajar, a living-room window open, and the girl nowhere to be found.

Burr’s disappearance sparked a significant manhunt, utilizing soldiers from nearby Fort Lewis, as well as members of the National Guard. Though several individuals were considered potential suspects in the years immediately following the disappearance, none led to Burr’s recovery. 

After Bundy was apprehended in 1978, he was considered a suspect when it was revealed that he (aged 14 in 1961) had lived near the Burr residence, that he delivered newspapers near Burr's house, and that the Burr home was very close to one of Bundy's earlier childhood homes where his favorite great-uncle lived. A size-6 shoe imprint was found outside the open living-room window, and some investigators believed this was consistent with a teenaged perpetrator. After corresponding with Bundy prior to his 1989 execution, Burr’s parents publicly stated that, based on circumstantial evidence, they believed their daughter's remains may have been buried on the University of Puget Sound campus.

In 2011, forensic testing of material evidence from the Burr crime scene yielded insufficient intact DNA sequences for comparison with Bundy's. , Burr's whereabouts remain unknown.

Life
Ann Marie Burr was born December 14, 1952 in Del Norte County, California, into a Roman Catholic family. She was the first of four children, with two younger sisters—Julie and Mary—and one younger brother, Gregory, born to Donald and Beverly (née Leach) Burr. Prior to her disappearance, Burr's family had moved into a house in the North End neighborhood of Tacoma, Washington, located at 3009 North 14th Street.

Disappearance
On the evening of August 30, 1961, Burr and her three siblings were sent to bed around 8:00 p.m. by their parents. Earlier that night, Burr had eaten dinner at the nearby home of a friend. Burr and her sister Mary (age 3) shared an upstairs bedroom, while brother Gregory (age 5) and sister Julie (age 7) shared a bedroom in the basement. At some point during the evening, several members of the house reported hearing their pet Cocker Spaniel barking. In the early morning hours of August 31, Burr woke her parents in their first-floor bedroom, complaining that Mary was crying. At the time, Mary was healing from a broken arm, which was in a cast. Their mother Beverly recalled soothing Mary before sending both girls back to bed, though she could not determine the time this occurred.

At approximately 5:30 a.m., Beverly realized that Ann was missing when they found Mary (who was again crying) alone in the bedroom. The front door of the home, which had been locked, was slightly ajar, while a small window in the living room was open. Grass from the front lawn was found inside the house; an overturned bench was discovered against the side of the home.

Investigation

Initial search efforts
Upon searching the home, law enforcement noticed a table of figurines beside the open living-room window was undisturbed, despite the appearance that someone had entered the home this way. A faint footprint was found near the overturned bench outside. Law enforcement estimated the shoe that made the print was likely a Keds sneaker, size six or seven. None of Burr's clothing or other personal items were missing from the home. It was determined that Burr had left the residence wearing only her blue nightgown, and a chain necklace with an engraved medal of Jesus and the Virgin Mary, an identification tag, and a medal of Saint Christopher.

On the morning Burr was reported missing, 100 soldiers from Fort Lewis, as well as 50 National Guardsmen from Camp Murray, aided local police in the search for the child. By 11:00 p.m., over 75 square blocks surrounding the Burr residence had been searched, included wooded areas, but no sign of her was found. Additionally, dive teams searched Commencement Bay for sign of Burr, but found nothing. Due to the lack of concrete evidence indicating an abduction had occurred, the FBI only assisted the case on a stand-by basis. A report submitted in the days following Burr's disappearance came from neighbors who heard screaming emanating from a vehicle with California license plates on the morning Burr went missing. However, when the driver of this vehicle was located, they explained that the noise had merely emanated from the radio and was mistaken for screaming.

On September 8, 1961, Donald and Beverly voluntarily took polygraph examinations in response to rumors that they had withheld information in their daughter's disappearance. Both were found to be truthful in their responses. The following day, Burr's maternal grandmother, Mrs. Roy Leach, posted a US$1,000 reward for information leading to the discovery of her granddaughter. The reward was increased to US$5,000 after allocation of additional funds.

Over 1,500 persons were interviewed within the first twelve days of Burr's disappearance. On October 31, 1961, law enforcement interviewed 31-year-old Hugh Bion Morse, an ex-Marine and suspect in the 1959 murder of 9-year-old Candy Rogers in Spokane. In June 1962, an employee at a service station in Portage la Prairie, Manitoba, Canada (directly across the U.S. border from Grand Forks, North Dakota), told law enforcement he saw a girl who appeared to be Burr accompanied by a man and woman who "spoke a little too sharply" to be her parents. The employee claimed the girl mentioned that she was from Tacoma. In the winter of 1964, law enforcement attempted to arrest Ralph Everett Larkee in Portland, Oregon; Larkee had been accused of kidnapping Gay Lynn Stewart, and was considered a possible suspect in Burr's disappearance, but he committed suicide with a pistol before police were able to apprehend him.

Potential involvement of Ted Bundy

After serial killer Ted Bundy was apprehended in 1978, he became a suspect in Burr's disappearance when law enforcement discovered he was a resident of Tacoma at the time of her disappearance, then age 14. At the time Burr disappeared, Bundy worked as a paperboy and delivered newspapers in the Burrs' neighborhood, with his paper delivery route crossing near the Burr family residence; he also had a great-uncle  whom he often visited  who taught music at the University of Puget Sound (UPS), which was located several blocks from the Burr home. Bundy would have crossed very near to the house where Burr disappeared, as he had to pass 6th Avenue and N. Fife Streets, where the office manager for the route was. The unknown size 6 shoe imprint, found outside the window from which Burr was abducted, was consistent with a teenage perpetrator. When questioned in Burr's disappearance, Bundy told law enforcement that he "wouldn't have hurt a little girl" and denied involvement. In 1987, Bundy confided to author Robert D. Keppel that there were "some murders" that he would "never talk about", because they were committed "too close to home", "too close to family", or involved "victims who were very young". Burr's disappearance matched all three of these categories.

Burr's parents told the media at this time that they believed their daughter's body had been buried in excavation sites on the UPS campus, where construction was underway in 1961. However, they claimed neither they nor their daughter knew Bundy. Beverly stated that, after two letter exchanges with Bundy while he was on death row, "he avoided the real questions, talking instead about the Green River murders and world events." In one correspondence, Bundy insisted that, in 1961, he was "a normal fourteen-year-old boy. I did not wander the streets late at night. I did not steal cars. I had absolutely no desire to harm anyone." Donald later told crime writer Ann Rule that he believed he saw Bundy in a ditch on the UPS campus the morning of his daughter's disappearance.

In 2011, contact evidence from the Burr crime scene was compared to DNA samples of Bundy, but testing failed to link him to the Burr residence due to the fact that a full DNA profile could not be produced from the evidence.

Aftermath
In July 1963, nearly two years after Burr's disappearance, her parents adopted an infant girl named Laura. Burr's family held a memorial service for her in 1999. Donald Burr died in 2003 at age 77. Beverly Burr died of congestive heart failure on September 13, 2008, at her residence in Tacoma.

See also
List of people who disappeared

References

Sources

External links

1960s missing person cases
1961 in Washington (state)
Missing American children
Missing person cases in Washington (state)
Ted Bundy
Tacoma, Washington